Richard Dean Davis (born November 24, 1958) is an American former soccer midfielder, and former captain of the U.S. National Team for much of the 1980s. He is considered by fans the best U.S.-born player of the North American Soccer League era and is a member of the National Soccer Hall of Fame.

Youth
Davis was born in Denver, Colorado, and began playing soccer at the age of seven for an AYSO soccer team in Claremont, California.  He was an All-American high school player at Damien High School in La Verne, California. In 1977, he played a single season of college soccer at Santa Clara University  While at Santa Clara, he was a member of the Broncos team which took the U-19 National Open Championship (McGuire Cup).

Professional

An American on a team of international superstars with the New York Cosmos, he helped the team to three NASL league titles in 1978, 1980 and 1982. He began playing with the team during the 1978 season and was selected as the 1979 North American Player of the Year in his second season. He was selected as an NASL all-star Honorable Mention in the 1983 season.

In 1983, the St. Louis Steamers of the Major Indoor Soccer League signed Davis away from the Cosmos.  Davis moved just in time to avoid the collapse of the Cosmos.  Despite numerous nagging injuries, Davis led the Steamers in scoring and was an integral part of the team's run to the MISL championship series which the Steamers lost to the Baltimore Blast.  He played one more season with the Steamers before moving to the New York Express, an MISL expansion team heavily staffed by former Cosmos players. The team lasted until the 1986-1987 All-Star break when it folded.

In March 1987, Davis moved to the Tacoma Stars for the remainder of the 1986-1987 season.  In January 1989, Davis injured his knee, requiring multiple surgeries. He was on the roster for the 1989 Seattle Storm of the Western Soccer Alliance.  In 1990, he retired from playing professional soccer.

National team
Davis became an integral part of the U.S. national team in 1977, first with the U.S. Olympic team and U20 teams, then the senior national team.  Between September 11 and October 4, 1976, the U.S. U-20 national team played the qualifying games for the 1977 FIFA World U-20 Championship.  While the team went 5-2, it failed to qualify.  Davis led the team scoring with eight goals.  When he was 17 years old, he made his senior national team debut in a September 15, 1977 match against El Salvador.  Even more, he scored his first international goal in that game.  He became a regular on the team, playing in all eight U.S. matches in 1977.  Davis continued to play for the Olympic team, which qualified for the 1980 Summer Olympics.  However, President Carter's boycott of those games, held in Moscow, stopped the team from competing.  Davis played for the U.S. in the 1984 Olympics, where he scored two goals in the U.S. victory over Costa Rica.  In 1984, he was also named the U.S. Soccer Athlete of the Year, the first year of the award.  He played again at the 1988 Summer Olympics.  Davis' experience and leadership led him to being named captain of the U.S. national team.  In this capacity, he led the team during 1988, and was looking forward to the 1990 FIFA World Cup qualifying games in 1989.  However, he suffered a serious knee injury in January 1989.  Although he tried to work himself back into shape in order to make the World Cup roster, U.S. coach Bob Gansler never called him back to the team, and Davis retired from playing.  Overall, he earned 36 caps (a record at the time), scoring nine goals for the senior national team.

International Goals

Team management
After his retirement from playing, Davis became the head coach and general manager of the Los Angeles Salsa of the American Professional Soccer League.  In 2004, he was named Director of Programs for AYSO, and in 2006, he was named its National Executive Director.  On March 9, 2010, AYSO announced the resignation of Davis effective May 11, 2010.

Broadcasting
Davis has also had a long career in soccer broadcasting.  In 1989, he and JP Dellacamera provided live commentary for the match pitting the champions of the Western Soccer Alliance and the American Soccer League.  He would provide television commentary at both the 1990 and 1994 World Cups for ABC.  He continues to work as a commentator for Los Angeles Galaxy games.

Davis was elected to the National Soccer Hall of Fame in 2001.

Statistics

NASL

MISL

References

External links
 NASL/MISL stats
 10 Questions With... Rick Davis
 

1958 births
Living people
American soccer players
Association football commentators
Footballers at the 1984 Summer Olympics
Footballers at the 1988 Summer Olympics
Major Indoor Soccer League (1978–1992) players
North American Soccer League (1968–1984) indoor players
New York Cosmos players
New York Express players
North American Soccer League (1968–1984) players
National Soccer Hall of Fame members
Olympic soccer players of the United States
Soccer players from Denver
St. Louis Steamers (original MISL) players
Tacoma Stars players
Seattle Storm (soccer) players
Santa Clara Broncos men's soccer players
United States men's under-20 international soccer players
United States men's international soccer players
Western Soccer Alliance players
Association football midfielders